Miro Klaić (born July 12, 1976) is a Bosnian-Herzegovinian retired footballer who primarily played for HNK Orašje in the Premier League of Bosnia and Herzegovina.

International career
He made his debut for Bosnia and Herzegovina in a March 2000 friendly match against Macedonia and has earned a total of 2 caps, scoring no goals. His second and final international was an August 2000 friendly against Turkey.

References

External links
 

1976 births
Living people
People from Brčko District
Association football defenders
Bosnia and Herzegovina footballers
Bosnia and Herzegovina international footballers
NK Brotnjo players
NK Široki Brijeg players
HNK Orašje players
Premier League of Bosnia and Herzegovina players
First League of the Federation of Bosnia and Herzegovina players